The 1962 Star World Championships were held in Cascais, Portugal in 1962.

Results

References

Star World Championships
1962 in sailing
Sport in Cascais
Sailing competitions in Portugal